Sir John Keith, 1st Earl of Kintore PC (Scot) ( – 12 April 1715), was a Scottish nobleman.

Early life
He was the fourth son of nine surviving children born to William Keith, 6th Earl Marischal, and Lady Mary Erskine. Among his siblings were brothers William Keith (the 7th Earl), George Keith (the 8th Earl), Sir Robert Keith, Alexander Keith, and sisters Mary Keith (wife of John, Lord Kinpont), Jean Keith (wife of Alexander, Lord Forbes of Pitsligo), Anne Keith, and Isobel Keith (wife of MP Edward Turnor, son of Edward Turnor, Speaker of the House of Commons).

His father was the eldest son of George Keith, 5th Earl Marischal and his wife, the Hon. Margaret Home (a daughter of Alexander Home, 5th Lord Home). His mother was the eldest daughter of John Erskine, 19th and de jure 2nd Earl of Mar (the only son of another John Erskine and Annabella Murray) and, his second wife, Marie Stewart (the daughter of Esmé Stewart, 1st Duke of Lennox).

Career

A Royalist during the Civil War, Keith and his brother William Keith, 7th Earl Marischal held Dunnottar Castle against Oliver Cromwell's forces in 1651. The Honours of Scotland had been placed at Dunnottar for safety during the Wars of the Three Kingdoms, and Robert Overton, commanding a force of the New Model Army besieged the Castle hoping to recover them.

While the regalia was smuggled out of the castle to be hidden at Kinneff Parish church, Keith boarded ship for France, and was captured on his return by the parliamentarians. Keith insisted that he had delivered them to Charles II. The regalia remained at Knneff until the Restoration.

In 1676, he was made Councillor to the Privy Council of Scotland and a commissioner of the Council for Public Affairs in 1677. He was created Knight Marischal of Scotland upon Charles II return, and in 1677 was created Earl of Kintore along with the subsidiary title of Lord Keith of Inverurie and Keith Hall, a reward for his part in preserving the Honours of Scotland in various hiding-places during the British Interregnum. and Between 1684 and 1687 Kintore was Treasurer-Depute of Scotland. He was Keeper of the Privy Seal of Scotland in 1689. Lord Kintore was a supporter of both the Glorious Revolution and the 1707 Acts of Union.

On 22 February 1694, Lord Kintore "had a regrant, after resignation, of his titles extending the remainder to his elder brother" George Keith, 7th Earl Marischal, "and the heirs male of his body, whom failing to the heirs general of his own body."

Personal life
On 24 April 1662, Kintore was married to Lady Margaret Hamilton (b. 1641), the only child, born posthumously, of Thomas Hamilton, 2nd Earl of Haddington by his second wife Lady Jean Gordon (the third daughter of George Gordon, 2nd Marquess of Huntly and Lady Anne Campbell, herself a daughter of Archibald Campbell, 7th Earl of Argyll). Together, they were the parents of:

 Lady Jean Keith (b. 1678), who married Sir William Forbes, 4th Baronet of Monymusk
 Lady Margaret Keith, who married Maj. Gavin Hamilton of Raploch, a son of William Hamilton of Raploch and Jean (née Kennedy) Hamilton.
 William Keith, 2nd Earl of Kintore (1695–1718), who married Hon. Catherine Murray, the eldest daughter of David Murray, 4th Viscount of Stormont and Lady Jean Murray (a widow of James Murray, 2nd Earl of Annandale and the eldest daughter of James Carnegie, 2nd Earl of Southesk).

Lord Kintore died on 12 April 1715. He was succeeded by his only son, William.

References

1715 deaths
Earls of Kintore
Peers of Scotland created by Charles II
Year of birth unknown
17th-century Scottish people
18th-century Scottish people
Younger sons of earls
Scottish knights
Scottish soldiers
Cavaliers
Members of the Privy Council of Scotland
Treasurers-depute
Members of the Convention of the Estates of Scotland 1689
Commissioners of the Treasury of Scotland
1630 births